The men's moguls event in freestyle skiing at the 2010 Winter Olympics in Vancouver, Canada took place on February 14 at Cypress Bowl Ski Area.  This event produced the first gold medal for Canada as an Olympic host country and the first silver medal for Australia in Winter Olympic competition.

Results

Qualification
The qualification was held at 14:30.

Final
The final was held at 17:30.

RNS = Run Not Scored

References 

Men's freestyle skiing at the 2010 Winter Olympics
Men's events at the 2010 Winter Olympics